Pablo Alejandro Parra Rubilar (born 23 July 1994) is a Chilean professional footballer who plays for the Liga MX club Puebla as a midfielder.

Club career
After having renewed his contract with Curicó Unido from his loan from Cobreloa, he moved to Liga MX club Puebla on second half 2021.

International career

In November 2020, he received his first call up to the Chile senior team for the 2022 World Cup qualifiers against Peru and Venezuela, but he didn't make any appearance. He made his international debut at the friendly match against Bolivia on March 26, 2021, by replacing César Pinares at the minute 64.

International goals

References

External links
 
Pablo Parra at everythingforfootball

Living people
1994 births
People from Chillán
Chilean footballers
Chile international footballers
Chilean expatriate footballers
Chilean Primera División players
Primera B de Chile players
Segunda División Profesional de Chile players
Liga MX players
Cobreloa footballers
Ñublense footballers
Coquimbo Unido footballers
Universidad de Chile footballers
Curicó Unido footballers
Club Puebla players
Expatriate footballers in Mexico
Chilean expatriate sportspeople in Mexico
Chilean expatriates in Mexico
Association football midfielders